Paul F. "Shad" Huston (June 2, 1925 – February 2, 1992) was an American professional basketball player. Huston was the eighth overall pick in the 1947 BAA draft by the Chicago Stags. He played for one season in the league and averaged 3.6 points per game.

BAA career statistics

Regular season

Playoffs

External links
 
 Ohio State Buckeyes men's basketball during World War II

1925 births
1992 deaths
All-American college men's basketball players
American men's basketball players
Basketball players from Ohio
Chicago Stags draft picks
Chicago Stags players
Forwards (basketball)
Guards (basketball)
Ohio State Buckeyes men's basketball players
Sportspeople from Xenia, Ohio